House of Councillors elections were held in Japan on July 29, 2007. The date was originally to be July 22, but the ruling Liberal Democratic Party (LDP) decided in mid-June to extend the session of the House for a week to finish up legislative business; this step was criticised due to the short-term delay.

The House of Councillors consists of 242 members who serve six-year terms. Approximately half the members are elected every three years. The previous elections took place in 2004 when Junichiro Koizumi, Abe's predecessor, was in office.

The house ended its 166th session on July 5, 2007, marking the unofficial beginning of campaign. The official campaign began on July 12.

The ruling coalition of Liberal Democratic Party and New Komeito lost control, creating the first divided Diet (opposition control of the House of Councillors) since 1999. The LDP became the second party for the first time, while the DPJ became first party for the first time.

Background
The DPJ had 79 seats (82 including shin-ryokufukai) after the 2004 Upper House elections, winning 50 out of the 121 up for election, gaining 12, compared to the LDP's 49. As of February 17, 2007, the DPJ held 82 seats to the LDP's 111.

Ichirō Ozawa, the leader of the DPJ, addressed a workers' May Day rally in Yoyogi Park on April 28, 2007, setting out the party's agenda for the election. He pledged that the key policy areas would be an end to 'self-righteous' government, pension and medical reforms, and that the DPJ would 'stand in the shoes of workers, residents, and taxpayers'.

Reports throughout 2007 showed Shinzō Abe's approval ratings falling, and public support for the DPJ's position on the recent pension scandal. Several other scandals right up until the start of official campaigning did not improve the outlook for the LDP.

Political issues
Loss of records for millions of payments in the national pension system. 
Series of gaffes by cabinet members, the Minister of Health, Labour and Welfare Hakuo Yanagisawa and the Minister of Defense Fumio Kyuma, who later resigned.
Financial scandals of two Ministers of Agriculture, Toshikatsu Matsuoka, who later committed suicide, and his successor Norihiko Akagi, who resigned after the election.

Results 

According to results by NHK, the LDP lost its majority in the Upper House. Meanwhile, the DPJ managed to gain the largest margin since its formation in 1996.  LDP's coalition partner New Komeito lost 3 of its twelve seats.
Although the opposition made it clear that they intended to officially ask for Abe's resignation, he vowed to "continue pitching" for leadership.

Most of the candidates who received international coverage were defeated in the elections - including Alberto Fujimori, Kaori Tahara, Kanako Otsuji, Yoshiro Nakamatsu, and Yuko Tojo.  Notable candidates who were elected included iconoclastic former Nagano governor Yasuo Tanaka, who achieved one seat for his own New Party Nippon, and ethnic Finn Marutei Tsurunen, who was re-elected with the sixth-highest vote count on the DPJ party list.

The election resulted in the removal of numerous LDP councillors representing doctors, dentists, the construction industry and other special interest groups. Historically, such individuals had been elected solely by the votes of members of their own industries.

By prefecture
Elected candidates in bold

Notes:
 All incumbents not running for re-election in their prefectural electoral district are counted as retirements even if they ran in the nationwide proportional representation.
 In a multi-member district, there is no difference between Councillors elected with the highest and lower vote shares. Yet, "top tōsen", i.e. being elected with the highest vote, is considered a special achievement and thus noted where changed from the previous election for the same class of Councillors (2001).
 Akita, Toyama, Ehime and Miyazaki are counted as a DPJ/PNP pickups because the elected Councillors joined the DPJ/PNP parliamentary group shortly after the election.
 Gifu is counted as a LDP hold because the elected Councillor re-joined the LDP shortly after the election.
 In Kanagawa, the LDP's Yutaka Kobayashi was disqualified for violating the law on elections for public office. Because the seat fell vacant within three months of the regular election fourth ranking Akira Matsu (Kōmeitō) was elected without vote (kuriage-tōsen).

Source:

References

Japan
2007 elections in Japan
House of Councillors (Japan) elections
July 2007 events in Japan
Election and referendum articles with incomplete results